Himalayasaurus is an extinct genus of ichthyosaur from the Late Triassic Qulonggongba Formation of Tibet. The type species Himalayasaurus tibetensis was described in 1972 on the basis of fragmentary remains, including teeth, limb bones, and vertebrae. Himalayasaurus has since been considered a nomen dubium or "dubious name" because of the lack of features that set it apart from other ichthyosaurs, although the presence of distinct cutting edges on its teeth have more recently been proposed as a unique feature of the genus (cutting edges have also been found in the recently described ichthyosaur Thalattoarchon from the western United States). Himalayasaurus belongs to the family Shastasauridae, which includes other large-bodied Triassic ichthyosaurs like Shonisaurus.

See also
 List of ichthyosaurs
 Timeline of ichthyosaur research

References

Late Triassic ichthyosaurs
Late Triassic reptiles of Asia
Ichthyosauromorph genera